Sandro Andy S.A.S, commonly known as Sandro Paris, is a French ready-to-wear brand founded in 1984 by Évelyne Chetrite in Paris.

History
Sandro was founded by Évelyne Chetrite with the help of her husband in 1984 as a premium contemporary brand positioned between luxury designer brands and mass market brands. Évelyne Chetrite has described the philosophy of the brand as "casual but always chic" and "sophisticated but cool." 

It began as a womenswear brand before Ilan Chetrite, the son of founder Évelyne Chetrite, joined the company and launched Sandro Homme in 2008. 

Sandro Homme's design was described by Wmagazine as "masculine but not at all macho" and "timeless but with a bit of edge."

Sandro's business model was exclusively wholesale until 2007 when it began opening stand-alone retail stores in Europe. The first Sandro boutique in the U.S. opened in 2011 in New York City.

Isabelle Allouch, a former Balenciaga executive before joining SMCP Group, was named CEO in 2019.

References

External links
 
 

French companies established in 1984
Clothing brands of France
Clothing companies of France
Clothing companies established in 1984
Design companies established in 1984
French brands
Clothing brands
High fashion brands
Companies based in Paris